Numan Çürüksu (born 2 December 1984 in Trabzon) is a Turkish footballer who plays for Kocaelispor.

Numan made his debut in professional football in the year 2006 season as part of the Sürmenespor squad.

References

External links

1984 births
Living people
Turkish footballers
Süper Lig players
Kayseri Erciyesspor footballers
Orduspor footballers
Ankaraspor footballers
Sportspeople from Trabzon
Association football defenders